The 2016–17 Meralco Bolts season was the seventh season of the franchise in the Philippine Basketball Association (PBA).

Key dates

2016
October 30: The 2016 PBA draft took place at Midtown Atrium, Robinson Place Manila.

Draft picks

Special draft

Regular draft

Roster

Philippine Cup

Eliminations

Standings

Game log

|- style="background:#fcc;"
| 1
| November 27
| Blackwater
| L 84–86
| Cliff Hodge (14)
| Kelly Nabong (10)
| Cliff Hodge (8)
| Smart Araneta Coliseum
| 0–1

|- style="background:#cfc;"
| 2
| December 3
| NLEX
| W 106–93
| Chris Newsome (28)
| Chris Newsome (10)
| Chris Newsome (5)
| Smart Araneta Coliseum
| 1–1
|- style="background:#cfc;"
| 3
| December 9
| TNT
| W 98–87
| Ed Daquioag (23)
| Chris Newsome (10)
| Chris Newsome (8)
| Smart Araneta Coliseum
| 2–1
|- style="background:#fcc;"
| 4
| December 14
| Alaska
| L 79–81
| Chris Newsome (23)
| Hodge, Newsome (8)
| Chris Newsome (5)
| Smart Araneta Coliseum
| 2–2
|- style="background:#fcc;"
| 5
| December 21
| Phoenix
| L 90–94
| Jonathan Grey (24)
| Cliff Hodge (11)
| Chris Newsome (8)
| Filoil Flying V Centre
| 2–3
|- style="background:#fcc;"
| 6
| December 28
| San Miguel
| L 86–101
| Chris Newsome (16)
| Cliff Hodge (15)
| Hodge, Newsome (5)
| Cuneta Astrodome
| 2–4

|- style="background:#fcc;"
| 7
| January 6
| GlobalPort
| L 89–97
| Reynel Hugnatan (23)
| Chris Newsome (10)
| Daquioag, Hodge, Newsome (3)
| Mall of Asia Arena
| 2–5
|- style="background:#fcc;"
| 8
| January 11
| Mahindra
| L 92–105
| Reynel Hugnatan (28)
| Bryan Faundo (7)
| Chris Newsome (8)
| Smart Araneta Coliseum
| 2–6
|- style="background:#fcc;"
| 9
| January 14
| Barangay Ginebra
| L 72–83
| Reynel Hugnatan (18)
| Chris Newsome (9)
| Chris Newsome (4)
| University of San Agustin Gym
| 2–7
|- style="background:#cfc;"
| 10
| January 20
| Rain or Shine
| W 82–72
| Chris Newsome (19)
| Cliff Hodge (16)
| Chris Newsome (6)
| Cuneta Astrodome
| 3–7
|- style="background:#fcc;"
| 11
| January 28
| Star
| L 73–120
| Chris Newsome (13)
| Cliff Hodge (7)
| Chris Newsome (4)
| Ynares Center
| 3–8

Commissioner's Cup

Eliminations

Standings

Game log

|- style="background:#cfc;"
| 1
| March 17
| Mahindra
| W 94–86
| Baser Amer (19)
| Alex Stepheson (21)
| Chris Newsome (7)
| Smart Araneta Coliseum
| 1–0
|- style="background:#cfc;"
| 2
| March 19
| NLEX
| W 91–84
| Jared Dillinger (20)
| Alex Stepheson (24)
| Baser Amer (4)
| Smart Araneta Coliseum
| 2–0
|- style="background:#cfc;"
| 3
| March 24
| TNT
| W 94–89
| Alex Stepheson (20)
| Alex Stepheson (27)
| Chris Newsome (7)
| Smart Araneta Coliseum
| 3–0
|- style="background:#cfc;"
| 4
| March 29
| Rain or Shine
| W 89–83
| Alex Stepheson (21)
| Alex Stepheson (15)
| Baser Amer (6)
| Mall of Asia Arena
| 4–0

|- style="background:#fcc;"
| 5
| April 2
| San Miguel
| L 92–99
| Dillinger, Stepheson (21)
| Alex Stepheson (26)
| Baser Amer (8)
| Smart Araneta Coliseum
| 4–1
|- style="background:#cfc;"
| 6
| April 8
| Alaska
| W 99–91
| Baser Amer (19)
| Alex Stepheson (26)
| Baser Amer (5)
| Mall of Asia Arena
| 5–1
|- style="background:#cfc;"
| 7
| April 16
| Blackwater
| W 102–91
| Jared Dillinger (21)
| Alex Stepheson (15)
| Alex Stepheson (5)
| Smart Araneta Coliseum
| 6–1
|- align="center"
|colspan="9" bgcolor="#bbcaff"|All-Star Break

|- style="background:#cfc;"
| 8
| May 3
| Phoenix
| W 81–66
| Baser Amer (20)
| Alex Stepheson (20)
| Amer, Hodge, Stepheson (3)
| Smart Araneta Coliseum
| 7–1
|- style="background:#fcc;"
| 9
| May 10
| GlobalPort
| L 86–94
| Alex Stepheson (19)
| Alex Stepheson (27)
| Baser Amer (7)
| Mall of Asia Arena
| 7–2
|- style="background:#fcc;"
| 10
| May 24
| Star
| L 90–108
| Chris Newsome (25)
| Alex Stepheson (9)
| Chris Newsome (8)
| Smart Araneta Coliseum
| 7–3
|- style="background:#fcc;"
| 11
| May 28
| Barangay Ginebra
| L 89–90
| Baser Amer (21)
| Alex Stepheson (20)
| Amer, Newsome (4)
| Ynares Center
| 7–4

Playoffs

Bracket

Game log

|- style="background:#fcc;" 
| 1 
| June 5 
| TNT
| L 84–102
| Chris Newsome (21)
| Alex Stepheson (16)
| Newsome, Stepheson (4)
| Smart Araneta Coliseum 
| 0–1
|- style="background:#cfc;" 
| 2
| June 7 
| TNT
| W 103–100 (OT)
| Baser Amer (32)
| Alex Stepheson (13)
| Jared Dillinger (6)
| Smart Araneta Coliseum 
| 1–1
|- style="background:#fcc;" 
| 3
| June 9 
| TNT
| L 96–104 (OT)
| Baser Amer (25)
| Hodge, Stepheson (12)
| Chris Newsome (9)
| Smart Araneta Coliseum 
| 1–2

Governors' Cup

Eliminations

Standings

Game log

|- style="background:#cfc;"
| 1
| July 19
| Blackwater
| W 107–78
| Baser Amer (20)
| Allen Durham (21)
| Baser Amer (8)
| Smart Araneta Coliseum
| 1–0
|- style="background:#cfc;"
| 2
| July 23
| Barangay Ginebra
| W 93–78
| Allen Durham (30)
| Allen Durham (24)
| Allen Durham (9)
| Smart Araneta Coliseum
| 2–0
|- style="background:#cfc;"
| 3
| July 29
| Rain or Shine
| W 89–73
| Allen Durham (23)
| Allen Durham (23)
| Allen Durham (8)
| Ynares Center
| 3–0

|- style="background:#cfc;"
| 4
| August 6
| Kia
| W 112–97
| Allen Durham (25)
| Allen Durham (11)
| Allen Durham (13)
| Smart Araneta Coliseum
| 4–0
|- style="background:#fcc;"
| 5
| August 13
| NLEX
| L 94–100
| Allen Durham (26)
| Allen Durham (14)
| Dillinger, Newsome (4)
| Mall of Asia Arena
| 4–1
|- style="background:#cfc;"
| 6
| August 18
| Phoenix
| W 107–104
| Allen Durham (33)
| Allen Durham (16)
| Allen Durham (7)
| Smart Araneta Coliseum
| 5–1

|- style="background:#fcc;"
| 7
| September 6
| TNT
| L 107–113
| Allen Durham (39)
| Allen Durham (24)
| Chris Newsome (5)
| Smart Araneta Coliseum
| 5–2
|- style="background:#cfc;"
| 8
| September 9
| Star
| W 96–90
| Allen Durham (29)
| Allen Durham (27)
| Durham, Newsome (7)
| Sta. Rosa Multi-Purpose Complex
| 6–2
|- style="background:#cfc;"
| 9
| September 15
| Alaska
| W 106–78
| Allen Durham (26)
| Allen Durham (18)
| Allen Durham (6)
| Smart Araneta Coliseum
| 7–2
|- style="background:#cfc;" 
| 10
| September 22
| GlobalPort
| W 100–93
| Chris Newsome (28)
| Allen Durham (22)
| Allen Durham (10)
| Mall of Asia Arena 
| 8–2
|- style="background:#cfc;" 
| 11
| September 24
| San Miguel
| W 104–101
| Allen Durham (35)
| Cliff Hodge (15)
| Allen Durham (8)
| Smart Araneta Coliseum 
| 9–2

Playoffs

Bracket

Game log

|- style="background:#fcc;" 
| 1
| September 26
| Blackwater
| L 91–92
| Chris Newsome (19)
| Allen Durham (21)
| Allen Durham (7)
| Mall of Asia Arena 
| 0–1
|- style="background:#cfc;" 
| 2
| September 28
| Blackwater
| W 104–96
| Baser Amer (31)
| Allen Durham (20)
| Allen Durham (9)
| Smart Araneta Coliseum 
| 1–1

|- style="background:#cfc;" 
| 1
| October 1
| Star
| W 72–66
| Allen Durham (23)
| Allen Durham (23)
| Jared Dillinger (5)
| Alonte Sports Arena 
| 1–0
|- style="background:#cfc;" 
| 2
| October 3
| Star
| W 98–74
| three players (18)
| Allen Durham (25)
| Baser Amer (8)
| Sta. Rosa Multi-Purpose Complex 
| 2–0
|- style="background:#cfc;" 
| 3
| October 5
| Star
| W 91–88 (OT)
| Allen Durham (24)
| Allen Durham (19)
| Allen Durham (6)
| Smart Araneta Coliseum 
| 3–0

|- style="background:#fcc;" 
| 1
| October 13
| Barangay Ginebra
| L 87–102
| Allen Durham (27)
| Allen Durham (14)
| Allen Durham (8)
| Quezon Convention Center
| 0–1
|- style="background:#fcc;" 
| 2
| October 15
| Barangay Ginebra
| L 76–86
| Allen Durham (25)
| Allen Durham (22)
| Allen Durham (7)
| Smart Araneta Coliseum16,159
| 0–2
|- style="background:#cfc;" 
| 3
| October 18
| Barangay Ginebra
| W 94–81
| Allen Durham (38)
| Allen Durham (20)
| Chris Newsome (12)
| Smart Araneta Coliseum
| 1–2
|- style="background:#cfc;" 
| 4
| October 20
| Barangay Ginebra
| W 85–83
| Allen Durham (28)
| Allen Durham (18)
| Jared Dillinger (5)
| Smart Araneta Coliseum16,164
| 2–2
|- style="background:#fcc;" 
| 5
| October 22
| Barangay Ginebra
| L 74–85
| Allen Durham (27)
| Allen Durham (19)
| Amer, Durham (5)
| Philippine Arena36,445
| 2–3
|- style="background:#cfc;" 
| 6
| October 25
| Barangay Ginebra
| W 98–91
| Allen Durham (28)
| Allen Durham (19)
| Chris Newsome (11)
| Philippine Arena53,642
| 3–3
|- style="background:#fcc;" 
| 7
| October 27
| Barangay Ginebra
| L 96–101
| Allen Durham (26)
| Allen Durham (24)
| Allen Durham (9)
| Philippine Arena54,086
| 3–4

Transactions

Trades

Commissioner's Cup

Governors' Cup

Recruited imports

Awards

References

Meralco Bolts seasons
Meralco Bolts season